Oliver Marach (born 16 July 1980) is an inactive Austrian professional tennis player who primarily specialises in doubles.

He achieved his highest singles ranking of world No. 82 in August 2005, but achieved most of his success in doubles where he reached his career-high doubles ranking of world No. 2 on 28 May 2018.  Marach won his first Grand Slam title at the 2018 Australian Open, partnering Mate Pavić, and the pair also finished runners-up at the 2017 Wimbledon Championships and 2018 French Open. He and Pavić were the 2018 ATP Doubles Team of the year. In mixed doubles, he has reached three Grand Slam semifinals.

He has represented Austria in the Davis Cup since 2003, and also played at the 2016 Olympic Games alongside Alexander Peya. In 2021, in the 2020 Tokyo Olympics, he partnered with Philipp Oswald.

Significant finals

Grand Slam tournament finals

Doubles: 3 (1 title, 2 runners-up)

Masters 1000 finals

Doubles: 1 (1 runner-up)

ATP career finals

Doubles: 53 (23 titles, 30 runners-up)

Performance timelines

Singles

Doubles
Current through the 2021 Davis Cup Finals.

References

External links
 
 
 

1980 births
Living people
Austrian male tennis players
Sportspeople from Graz
Sportspeople from Panama City
Tennis players at the 2016 Summer Olympics
Olympic tennis players of Austria
Australian Open (tennis) champions
Grand Slam (tennis) champions in men's doubles
Tennis players at the 2020 Summer Olympics